King County Metro is the public transit authority of King County, Washington, including the city of Seattle in the Puget Sound region. It operates a fleet of 1,396 buses, serving 115 million rides at over 8,000 bus stops in 2012, making it the eighth-largest transit agency in the United States. The agency has seven bases spread throughout its  operating area and has 131 park and rides for commuters.

Bases

Atlantic, Central, and Ryerson Bases are located close together near Stadium Station south of downtown Seattle and are known as the Central Campus. East and Bellevue bases comprise the East Campus and are located nearby each other in north Bellevue.  The South and East transit facilities finished an ADA retrofit in 2001.

Other

Transit centers

While Downtown Seattle is Metro's main transit hub, the transit centers act as smaller regional hubs and are served by many bus routes. Some transit centers also offer a park-and-ride facility. Metro operates out of several transit centers located throughout King County:

References

External links
Park & Ride Information

King County Metro facilities
facilities
King County Metro